Rozi Plain is a London-based musician originally from Winchester, England.

Biography
Rozi Plain was born Rosalind Leyden in Winchester, England, in 1986. In 2006 she moved to Bristol to study art, and she participated in the Cleaner Records group there. She recorded two records published by King Creosote’s Fence Records, Inside Over Here (2008) and Joined Sometimes Unjoined (2012). In 2012 she moved to London.

In November 2012 she recorded a live session for Lauren Laverne's BBC Radio 6 Music show.

In 2015 Plain released a new album, Friend, followed in 2016 by a companion album of remixes, unreleased tracks and radio sessions, Friend Of A Friend. In 2019 she released What a Boost and in 2020 What a Remix.

She is a member of This Is the Kit and regularly contributes to the music of her friends, including Rachael Dadd, François & the Atlas Mountains, and Bamboo, with whom she has performed live on a number of occasions in 2016.

Plain has toured with the likes of Devendra Banhart and KT Tunstall as well as performing at Green Man Festival and End of the Road Festival.

Discography

Inside Over Here - Fence Records (2008)
Joined Sometimes Unjoined - Fence Records / Talitres (2012)
Friend - Lost Map Records (2015)
Friend of a Friend - Lost Map Records (2016)
What a Boost - Memphis Industries (2019)
What a Remix (2020)
Prize (2023)

References

External links
Official website

British folk rock musicians
Living people
Year of birth missing (living people)
Musicians from Winchester
Musicians from Bristol